Ebiabowei Baker (born 30 January 1994) is a Nigerian footballer who plays as a defender for Zob Ahan and the Nigeria national under-23 team. He has been described as a reliable central defender who possesses pace, comfortable with the ball, solid, strong, natural defender as well as the ability to lead from the back and a good aerial presence.

Club career

Early career

Timpa United F.C. (2009)
Ebiabowei began his youth career with Timpa United then at Bayelsa state challenge cup, where they got knocked out at the semi-finals by former Nigeria Professional Football League champions Ocean Boys of Brass, Bayelsa at the semi-finals of the competition. Due to his brilliant performance, he got snapped up by Bayelsa United immediately after the competition.

Bayelsa United F.C (2009–2012)
In the 2009–10 season he transferred to Bayelsa United F.C., his hometown club in the Nigerian Professional Football League. On 12 April 2010 he made his official debut in the Nigeria top flight at the age of 16 when Bayelsa United Played as visitors against host Gateway F.C. at Abeokuta in far away Ogun State. That happened to be his only taste of 1st team action until they got relegated to the Nigeria national league. He would go on to make only 5 appearances in the lower league before jumping ship to harsh rivals Nembe city football club of Nembe - Bayelsa State.

Nembe City F.C (2011–2013)
After making the switch to Nembe City in their debut season in the Nigerian national league, and with 13 appearances and against all odds, they got promoted to the Nigeria premier football league as league champions. In their debut season in the NPFL (Nigeria professional football league, he made 6 appearances in the first 9 matches, but with hard work and dedication, which led to a goal in their 2–1 loss away to Nasarawa United in lafia. With a mouth watering offer from Dolphins football club of Port Harcourt that he could not resist, he moved to Dolphins F.C during the week-9 transfer window of the league season.

Dolphins F.C (2013–2014)
After making his debut in a substitute appearance against Kaduna United on 15 May 2013, he would go on to make 24 appearances in total for his new club, where he is sometimes used as a defensive midfielder, due to his ability to read games and calm composure while with the ball.

Tarxien Rainbows F.C. (2015-2016)
After an impressive league season with Dolphins FC of Port Harcourt, Baker secure a two year contract with Tarxien Rainbows FC of Malta with an agreement of moving at any time he secure a much better contract.

International career
On 25 April 2012 he was invited to the national under-20 team known as the Flying Eagles by coach John Obuh alongside three other players from Nembe City F.C., but missed the tournament due to injury. In December 2014 he was called up to the Nigeria national under-23 team. where he made three appearances against Warri Wolves, Dolphins FC and Kano Pillars in the 2015 Nigeria Globacom super 6 tournament held at Abuja and scoring a debut goal which turned out to be the winner in their first match against Warri Wolves football club of Warri. The "dream team" as the national under-23 team of Nigeria is fondly called, emerged 2nd in the tourney, behind the Flying Eagles of Nigeria.

Honours

Club
Bayelsa United F.C.: Federation Cup: Runners-up
Nembe City F.C.: Nigerian National League: Champions 2010-2011

References

1994 births
Living people
Persian Gulf Pro League players
Nigeria Professional Football League players
Association football defenders
Qadsia SC players
Expatriate footballers in Kuwait
Zob Ahan Esfahan F.C. players
Nembe City F.C. players
Kuwait Premier League players
Nigerian expatriate sportspeople in Kuwait
Bayelsa United F.C. players
Dolphin F.C. (Nigeria) players
Tarxien Rainbows F.C. players
Expatriate footballers in Malta
Nigerian expatriate sportspeople in Malta
Maltese Premier League players
Expatriate footballers in Iran
Nigerian expatriate sportspeople in Iran
Nigerian footballers